The LG VX8350 was designed to replace the LG VX8300, and has in turn been replaced by the LG VX8360. It uses a qualcomm msm6500 SoC.
The complete LG VX8350 list of specifications are:

External links 
 LG Verizon - Model VX8350

VX8350